Rachel Lynn Matthews (born October 25, 1993) is an American actress. She is known for starring in the film Happy Death Day and its sequel, Happy Death Day 2U.

Early life and career
A native of Los Angeles, Matthews was born in 1993, the eldest daughter of actress Leslie Landon and Brian Matthews. She became interested in acting at an early age by watching Shirley Temple movies, leading to tap and voice classes, and ultimately joining a local theater program at the age of 10. Matthews continued to pursue the stage life by studying acting at New York University Tisch School of the Arts. In college, Matthews became friends with fellow actress Camila Mendes, who would become her roommate upon returning to Los Angeles, and musician Maggie Rogers, who would feature both in her music video "Give a Little".

In 2017, Matthews had her film debut in Happy Death Day, directed by her uncle Christopher Landon, playing sorority house president Danielle Bouseman, a role she would play again in the 2019 sequel Happy Death Day 2U. That same year, Matthews was cast as the villainous thief Magpie in the TV series Batwoman, had a small role in the Hulu series Looking for Alaska and voiced a character in ''Frozen II.

In March 2020, it was reported that she had tested positive for COVID-19 amidst the COVID-19 pandemic in the United States.

Filmography

Film

Television

References

External links
 

1993 births
Actresses from Greater Los Angeles
American television actresses
Living people
Michael Landon family
Tisch School of the Arts alumni
21st-century American actresses